Qatar-8 is a faint solar analog located in the northern circumpolar constellation Ursa Major. With an apparent magnitude of 11.71, it is impossible to detect with the naked eye, but can be located with a powerful telescope.

Properties 
Qatar-8 is a relatively old star, with an age of 8.3 billion years. At this rate, it is on the final stages of the main sequence. It has a similar effective temperature to the Sun at 5,738 K. Despite that, it has a 69% greater luminosity than the Sun. Qatar-8 has a radius 31.5% greater than the Sun, and has a similar metallicity to the Sun despite its age.

Planetary system 

In 2019, the Qatar Exoplanet Survey (QES) discovered planets around Qatar-9, itself, and Qatar-10. However, Qatar-8b is a puffy Hot Saturn unlike the other planets discovered.

Since Qatar-8b is a puffy planet, it only has 37.1% the mass of Jupiter. Due to that, it puffs up to a radius that is 28.5% larger than the latter's. It also has an effective temperature of 1,457 K. Qatar-8 is ten times closer to its star than Mercury is to the Sun, which corresponds to a typical four-day orbit.

Companion 
Qatar-8 was suspected to have a stellar companion, which makes it a binary star. However, a study in 2020 after analysis of many other stars show no stellar companion at all.

References 

Ursa Major (constellation)
G-type main-sequence stars